Luis Vera can refer to:

 Luis Vera (Chilean footballer) (1929-2014), Chilean football left-back
 Luis Vera (Uruguayan footballer) (born 1943), Uruguayan football forward
 Luis R. Vera (born 1952), Chilean film director
 Luis Vera (Venezuelan footballer) (born 1973), Venezuelan football midfielder